Shadwell Basin is a housing and leisure complex built around a disused dock in Wapping, London. The old dock was formerly part of the London Docks, a group of docks built by the London Dock Company at Shadwell and Wapping as part of the wider docks of the Port of London.

Today Shadwell Basin is one of the most significant bodies of water surviving from the historical London Docks. It is situated on the north side of the river Thames east (downstream) of the Tower of London and Tower Bridge and west (upstream) of Limehouse.

Unlike some of the London Docks which have been landfilled, Shadwell Basin, the most easterly part of the complex, has been retained. It is now a maritime square of 2.8 hectares used for recreational purposes (including sailing, canoeing and fishing) and is surrounded on three sides by a waterside housing development designed by British architects MacCormac, Jamieson, Prichard and Wright.

The residential buildings are four and five storeys with façades of alternating open arches and enclosed structure, echoing the scale of traditional 19th century dockside warehouses, with a colonnade at quayside. The development, made up of Newlands Quay, Maynards Quay and Peartree Lane, was added to the National Heritage List for England by Historic England as Grade II listed in 2018, part of a first-ever listing of Post-Modern buildings.

Shadwell Basin has Benson Quay on its south-west corner with its south side overlooked by Riverside Mansions in Milk Yard and the Monza Building in Monza Street and, at its south-eastern end, the former Wapping Hydraulic Power Station building.

On the north side of Shadwell Basin, east of Newlands Quay, St. Paul's Church, Shadwell provides a dramatic backdrop with its spire and the St Paul's Church Conservation Area extends to the water's edge with a terraced quayside that includes an outdoor gym.

A Scherzer Bascule bridge spans one of the entrances on the East side of the basin. This was built in the 1930s by the Port of London Authority and was restored by the London Docklands Development Corporation during their redevelopment of the site in the 1980s. 

Shadwell Basin is a popular public route for cyclists, joggers and pedestrians with a walkway alongside the water as part of the linked open spaces and canals between the river and Hermitage Basin near St Katharine Docks to the west.

History
The London Docks expanded eastward in the 1830s with the opening of the Eastern Dock and Shadwell Basin (built 1828–32). To provide these new docks with access to the river, a new entrance at Shadwell was built. Opened in 1832, it was named Shadwell Entrance (the main entrance to the London Dock was through Wapping Entrance with a third entrance at Hermitage Basin).

By the 1850s, the London Dock Company had recognised that the entrances at both Wapping and Shadwell were too small to accommodate the newer and larger ships coming into service. In 1854-58 the company built a new larger entrance (45 feet wide) and a new basin at Shadwell (the only element of the London Docks system to have survived redevelopment to this day) linked to the west part of the docks by Eastern Dock and the short Tobacco Dock.

The small size of the London Docks made them outdated by the early 20th century as steam power meant ships were built too large to fit into them. Cargoes were unloaded downriver and then ferried by barge to warehouses in Wapping. This system was uneconomic and inefficient and one of the main reasons that London's western docks (St Katherine's and the London Docks)were the first to close in the 1960s.

The London Docks complex closed to shipping in 1969. Purchased by the London Borough of Tower Hamlets, Shadwell Basin and the western part of the London Docks fell into a derelict state, mostly a large open tract of land and water. Acquired in 1981 by the London Docklands Development Corporation (LDDC), redevelopment of Shadwell Basin took place in 1987 resulting in 169 houses and flats being built around the retained historic dock.

Landmarks

(North)
 St. Paul's Church, Shadwell — the Church of Sea Captains

(South)
 The former Wapping Hydraulic Power Station building (previously the site of the Wapping Project arts venue and Wapping Food restaurant).
 Prospect of Whitby

(East)
 King Edward VII Memorial Park — giving access to the River Thames
 The Shadwell Basin Outdoor Activity Centre - including Tower Hamlets Canoe Club and Docklands Dive School

People

People associated with the area:

 Captain James Cook (1728–1779) lived in the area, and baptised some of his children at St. Paul's Church, Shadwell 
 Jane Randolph Jefferson (1720–1776), mother of President of the United States Thomas Jefferson, was born in Shakespeare Walk (a road which ran from north to south in the middle of what is now Shadwell Basin) and was baptised at St. Paul's Church, Shadwell
 John Wesley (1703–1791) preached at St. Paul's Church, Shadwell
 Sir William Henry Perkin (1838–1907) chemist who discovered aniline purple dye was baptised at St. Paul's Church, Shadwell

Neighbouring streets
North of Shadwell Basin

Newlands Quay — formerly Elbow Lane (in 1862)

East of Shadwell Basin

Pear Tree Lane — formerly Fox's Lane (in 1862).  Named after The Pear Tree, the inn where the second group of Ratcliff Highway murders took place.

West of Shadwell Basin

Maynards Quay off Garnet Street — formerly New Gravel Lane (in 1862)
Benson Quay

South of Shadwell Basin starting from the west:

Milk Yard
Monza Street
Wapping Wall

References & links

Geography of the London Borough of Tower Hamlets
London docks
Port of London
Shadwell
Wapping